Irafshan Rural District is a rural district (dehestan) in Ashar District, Mehrestan County, Sistan and Baluchestan province, Iran. At the 2006 census, its population was 4,186, in 803 families.  The rural district has 21 villages.

References 

Rural Districts of Sistan and Baluchestan Province
Mehrestan County